Dog City is an animated television series that was produced by Nelvana Limited and Jim Henson Productions in association with Channel 4, Global Television Network, FORTA and Canal+ Spain and aired on Fox Kids from September 26, 1992, to November 26, 1994, and in Canada on YTV until 2000. The show contained both animation by Nelvana, and puppetry by Jim Henson Productions, similar to Little Muppet Monsters.

Television film
Dog City was originally an hour-long live-action television film, broadcast on May 5, 1989, as an episode of The Jim Henson Hour, featuring the characters as puppets. In Dog City: The Movie, Ace Yu inherits a bar-restaurant called the Dog House following the death of his Uncle Harry and is harassed for protection money by crime syndicate boss Bugsy Them (who was responsible for the death of Uncle Harry. Harry as it turns out, was actually Ace's father). Refusing to pay or fight him, Bugsy kidnaps Ace's love interest, Colleen. There are car chases and shoot-em-ups and rubber duckies involved in the action. In the end, Ace defeats Bugsy and gets the girl.

Characters
 Ace Yu (performed by Kevin Clash) - A German Shepherd adopted by Chinese Pekingese parents. Although Ace's puppet is a Hand-Rod Puppet, it is later modified into a Live-Hand Puppet when it was used to play Eliot in the TV series.
 Colleen Barker (performed by Fran Brill) - A Rough Collie who serves as Ace's love interest. The name was later used in TV series.
 Bugsy Them (performed by Jim Henson) - A vain bulldog crime boss who is proud of his tail. His puppet is later used to play Bruno in the TV series.
Miss Belle (performed by Camille Bonora) - A poodle that is the key associate and the wife of Bugsy Them.
 Mad Dog (performed by Steve Whitmire) - Bugsy Them's dimwitted St. Bernard henchman. His puppet is later used to play Bowser in the TV series.
 Scruffy (performed by Gord Robertson) - Bugsy Them's henchman who is always scratching at his fleas.
 Laughing Boy (performed by Rickey Boyd) - Bugsy Them's henchman who is always laughing and cracking jokes.
 Bubba (performed by Jerry Nelson) - The bartender at the Dog House. He is a recycled and modified version of the Wolfhound from The Muppet Show.
 Mac (performed by Steve Whitmire) - The waiter at the Dog House. Although Steve Whitmire performed Mac in most scenes, Mac was performed by Rickey Boyd in a scene where he was sweeping.
 Quackers (performed by Rob Mills) - Ace Yu's sailor duck doll.
 Rowlf the Dog (performed by Jim Henson) - The piano-playing dog from The Muppet Show is the narrator of the TV movie.

Dog City: The Movie also features cameos by Sprocket the Dog from Fraggle Rock, Lyle the Dog and Baskerville the Hound from The Muppet Show, a dog character that resembles Tramp from Lady and the Tramp, and a background pug that later appears in Jim Henson's Animal Show, Puppet Up!, and other Henson Alternative projects.

The Muppets of Ace Yu and his associates would make cameos in The Muppets at Walt Disney World and would later go on to become Eliot Shag and the other "real world" counterparts to the animated characters.

Dog City: The Movie (sans the framing sequences) was released to regions 1 and 2.

The company's YouTube channel has 6 clips from the pilot in a playlist called "Dogs of Anarchy!".

Plot
The animated portions of the show focused on a canine private investigator named Ace Hart. The Muppet portions of the show focused on the interactions between Ace Hart and his animator Eliot Shag (who, like Ace, is a German Shepherd). Eliot would illustrate the stories while Ace would go traverse through it, occasionally breaking the fourth wall to speak with Eliot about the various troubles with the story. In one episode, Eliot even enters Dog City himself to join Ace in solving a mystery.

A recurring gag was that many of the characters in the cartoon were seemingly based on the residents of Eliot's apartment building. The bulldog crime-boss Bugsy Vile was inspired by the building's grouchy bulldog superintendent Bruno. Ace's love interest Rosie was based on Eliot's deep feelings for his neighbor Colleen, and so on. The Muppet characters were unaware of this. In the first episode, Bruno asks Eliot how a loser like him could have created a great character like Bugsy. Eliot replies, "Sometimes it just stares me right in the face."

Later series included segments from other shows Eliot worked on, including skits featuring the main Dog City characters and a superhero series starring the Batman parody Watchdog.

Characters

Animated
 Ace Hart (voiced by Ron White) - A German Shepherd who is a private-eye detective.
 Rosie O'Gravy (voiced by Elizabeth Hanna) - A beautiful Rough Collie who is the chief of detectives and Ace's love interest.
 Eddie (voiced by Stuart Stone) - An English Springer Spaniel news-pup who often tags along on Ace Hart's cases.
 Bugsy Vile (voiced by John Stocker) - A bulldog who is a crime boss. As the "Dogfather of Crime," he is the main enemy of Ace Hart.
 Frisky (voiced by James Rankin) - A chihuahua who is Bugsy Vile's excitable henchman.
 Mad Dog (voiced by Stephen Ouimette) - Bugsy Vile's psychotic mongrel henchman.
 Bruiser (voiced by Howard Jerome) - Bruiser is Bugsy Vile's tough nephew and henchman.
 Kitty (voiced by Paulina Gillis) - A female cat who serves as Bugsy's gun moll. She owns The Kitty Cat Club which is often used as a hideout and front for Bugsy Vile's group.
 Baron Von Rottweiler (voiced by Dan Hennessey) - A villainous German Rottweiler who is the secondary enemy of Ace Hart.
 Leon Burger - A dachshund who serves as valet and henchman to Baron Von Rottweiler. He doesn't talk for some reason.
 Mayor Kickbark (voiced by Stephen Ouimette) - The Mayor of Dog City. He is always undermining Rosie O'Gravy.
 Spunky the Flunky (voiced by John Stocker) - Mayor Kickbark's aide.
 Dot (voiced by Tara Strong) - Rosie O'Gravy's cute and lovely niece. She often appears with Rosie in "The Adventures of Rosie and Dot" segments. Her only dialogue was "Why".
 Steven (voiced by George Buza) - Steven was a canine watchman who was often seen in the animated segment with Yves.
 Yves (voiced by Rino Romano) - A cat burglar who debuted in the third season. He would try to steal something only to get thwarted comically by Steven.
 Sam Spayed (voiced by Toby Huss) - An old police dog who served as a teacher and father figure to the young Ace Hart. His name is a pun on the Dashiell Hammett character Sam Spade.
 Sherlock Bones (voiced by Andrew Dice Clay) - An English bloodhound detective who was a rival to Ace until he was exposed as an art thief. His name is a spoof of Sherlock Holmes.
 Woof Pack - A team of superhero dogs. The group was featured in comic vignettes, approaching mundane tasks like grocery shopping from a superheroic perspective.
Watch Dog (voiced by Don Francks) - Watchdog is a superhero who is a parody of Batman where his name is take on Alan Moore's graphic novel Watchmen. Watch Dog carries hourglasses which act as gas canisters, and constantly uses time and clock related gadgets and metaphors. In "Who Watches the Watch Dog," Watch Dog's creator Fob Canine (a caricature of Bob Kane) posed as Watch Dog where he has his fellow comic book artist pose as the Labrador Gang in order to get Watch Dog to be popular again. Watch Dog is also the leader of the superhero group called the Woof Pack when the "Woof Pack" segments debuted in Season 3.
Plastic Lassie - A collie with the power of elasticity and member of the Woof Pack.
Pectoral Pooch - A dog with super-strength and member of the Woof Pack.
Hear Boy - A sound-sensitive superhero and member of the Woof Pack.
Wonder Whelp - The smallest, and youngest member of the Woof Pack.

Muppets
 Eliot Shag (performed by Kevin Clash) - A German Shepherd who is the animator of Ace Hart's adventures. He often communicates with Ace Hart and would be interrupted by his girlfriend or Bruno. In "Who Watches the Watch Dog," it is revealed that Elliot is a fan of a superhero called the Hooded Hound. Seeing as Eliot is a Live-Hand Muppet, Kevin Clash is assisted in operating Eliot by Don Reardon who operates Eliot's right hand.
 Artie Springer (performed by Joey Mazzarino) - An English Springer Spaniel, Artie Springer is Eliot's young friend and son of Terri Springer. His favorite squeaky toy, a yellow rabbit called Mr Mookie, eventually starred in its own cartoon. Artie's puppet was previously seen as a background character in the original special. He served as the inspiration for Eddie.
 Colleen Barker (performed by Fran Brill) - A Rough Collie who is Eliot's neighbor and girlfriend. She is said to have moved away from the apartment when the character was dropped by Season Two. She was the first inspiration for Rosie O'Gravy.
 Terri Springer (performed by Fran Brill) - Terri Springer is an English Springer Spaniel who debuts in Season Two. She is Eliot's neighbor, Artie's mother, and a beautiful businesswoman. She served as the new inspiration for Rosie O'Gravy.
 Bruno (performed by Brian Muehl) - Bruno is a bulldog who is the surly building superintendent of the apartment that Eliot lives in and has a tendency to hassle Elliot. He served as the inspiration for Bugsy Vile.
Bowser (performed by David Rudman) - Bowser is a St. Bernard who is the hulking slow-witted handyman and Bruno's assistant who has a tendency to aide of hinder him. He served as the inspiration for Bruiser.
 Ms. Fluffé (performed by Kathryn Mullen (season 1 only) and Lisa Buckley) - A cat who is the landlady of the apartment that Eliot lives in. Ms. Fluffé often comes in conflict with Bruno over building policies and his tendency towards incompetence where Bruno generally kowtows to her. She served as the inspiration for Kitty.

Episodes

Series overview

Season 1 (1992–93)

Season 2 (1993)

Season 3 (1994)

Cast

Muppet performers
 Fran Brill as Terri Springer, Colleen Barker
 Lisa Buckley as Ms. Fluffé (Seasons 2 and 3)
 Kevin Clash as Eliot Shag
 John Kennedy as Additional characters
 Noel MacNeal as Doctor (ep. 23)
 Jim Martin as Bob Katz (ep. 12)
 Joey Mazzarino as Artie Springer
 Brian Muehl as Bruno
 Carmen Osbahr as Additional characters
 Don Reardon as Assistant Puppeteer for Eliot Shag
 Martin P. Robinson as Mr. McTaggert (ep. 6), Scratch McCollie (ep. 23)
 David Rudman as Bowser, Bram (ep. 7) Colonel Claghound (ep. 16)

Voices
 George Buza as Steven
 Tara Strong as Dot
 Paulina Gillis as Kitty
 Elizabeth Hanna as Rosie O'Gravy
 Dan Hennessey as Baron Von Rottweiler, Meat the Butcher (ep. 3), Additional Voices
 Howard Jerome as Bruiser
 Stephen Ouimette as Mad Dog, Mayor Kickbark
 James Rankin as Frisky, Screwy Louie (ep. 2)
 Rino Romano as Yves
 John Stocker as Bugsy Vile, Spunky the Flunky
 Stuart Stone as Eddie
 Ron White as Ace Hart

Additional voices
 Len Carlson
 Alyson Court
 Colin Fox as Claude Baddeley (ep. 12)
 Don Francks as Fob Canine/Watchdog
 Keith Knight
 Susan Roman
 Ron Rubin
 Chris Wiggins

Home releases
Two VHS tapes with two episodes each were released by Sony Wonder. Much Ado About Mad Dog contains the episodes Much Ado About Mad Dog and Old Dogs, New Tricks. The Big Squeak contains the episodes The Big Squeak and Boss Bruiser. Another tape, Disobedience School was released in the UK through Channel 4 and contains the episodes Disobedience School, The Dog Pound, and Radio Daze.

Dog City: The Movie was released to UK exclusive region 2 DVD, and a Region 1 DVD was released on June 8, 2010, though the series has not had any DVD release.  Most episodes of all three seasons are available from Amazon Video on Demand.

References

External links

1990s American animated television series
1990s American police comedy television series
1992 American television series debuts
1994 American television series endings
1990s Canadian animated television series
1992 Canadian television series debuts
1994 Canadian television series endings
Jetix original programming
Fox Kids
Fox Broadcasting Company original programming
Channel 4 original programming
YTV (Canadian TV channel) original programming
The Muppets television series
American television shows featuring puppetry
American television series with live action and animation
American children's animated comedy television series
American children's animated fantasy television series
American children's animated mystery television series
American detective television series
Canadian television shows featuring puppetry
Canadian television series with live action and animation
Canadian children's animated comedy television series
Canadian children's animated fantasy television series
Canadian children's animated mystery television series
Television series by The Jim Henson Company
Animated television series about dogs
Television series by Nelvana
Television soap opera parodies
Comedy franchises